Jiangshan Weizhong, also known as Da Qing Diguo, is a 2002 Chinese television series based on legends about the Yongzheng and Qianlong emperors of the Qing dynasty. The series was first broadcast in mainland China in December 2002.

Plot
The story is set in the Qing dynasty during the reign of the Yongzheng Emperor. Yongzheng's harsh and brutal policies lead to widespread discontent and dissension. Meanwhile, a secret death squad, named after their dreaded weapon — the flying guillotine — goes around slaying the emperor's enemies.

The young crown prince, Hongli, disguises himself as a commoner and embarks on an inspection tour to Jiangnan. There, the prince evades assassination attempts orchestrated by nobles plotting to seize the throne, and uncovers a shocking truth about his birth and origin. Besides, he also meets and befriends two maidens, Lü Siniang and Yuniang, who turn out to be actually planning to assassinate Yongzheng. Lu Siniang is the granddaughter of Lu Liuliang, whose family was executed. She trained under Princess Changping, the last princess of the former dynasty.

Cast
 Wu Jing as Hongli / Chen Bangguo
 Fan Bingbing as Lü Siniang
 Chen Yi as Lady Fuca
 Fu Chong as Yuniang
 Xu Huanshan as Kangxi Emperor
 Liu Guanxiong as Yongzheng Emperor
 Yang Hongwu as Yinti
 Wei Zongwan as Chen Shiguan
 Zhou Xianzhen as Mrs Chen
 Li Li as Lady Niohuru
 Lou Yonghuan as Zhaohui

External links
 

2002 Chinese television series debuts
Television series set in the Qing dynasty
Mandarin-language television shows
Chinese historical television series